Los Angeles County Lifeguards is a division of the Los Angeles County Fire Department. The Los Angeles County Lifeguard Service served as the model for the hit television series Baywatch which was created by recurrent lifeguard Gregory J. Bonann.

Lifeguards also provide marine firefighting, paramedic, and fire boat services to Catalina Island, with operations out of Avalon and the Isthmus. Other daily fire boat services operate out of Los Angeles Harbor (Baywatch Cabrillo), King Harbor (Baywatch Redondo), Marina Del Rey (Baywatch Del Rey and Baywatch Santa Monica) and Malibu Pier (Baywatch Malibu).

The Los Angeles County Fire Department Lifeguard Division is the largest professional lifeguard service in the world. Entering the year 2018, the Los Angeles County Lifeguard Service employs 177 year-round lifeguards (chiefs, captains and ocean lifeguard specialists) and over 650 seasonal lifeguards (recurrents). Operating out of four Sectional Headquarters, located in Hermosa, Santa Monica, Marina Del Rey and Zuma beach. Each of these headquarters staffs a 24-hour response unit, and are part of the 911 system.

In addition to providing marine firefighting, LA County Lifeguards have specialized training for fire boat operations.

Prior to July 1, 1994, Los Angeles County Lifeguards were part of the Department of Beaches and Harbors.

Vehicles employed 

 Ford Escape Hybrid (2008–2014)
 Ford Ranger (1994–2002)
 Ford Expedition
 Ford F-350 Super Duty
 Nissan Frontier (2003–2008)
 Toyota Tacoma (2015–present)
 Toyota Tundra (2015–present)
 Toyota Sequoia (2015–present)

Lifeguard uniforms 
The following categories of lifeguard clothing in sufficient quantities to fully annually outfit 760 male lifeguards and 136 female lifeguards, which numbers can change each agreement year based upon the workforce composition then in employment, as ordered by the county including the following:

 Short-sleeve and long-sleeve polo shirts;
 Volley swim trunks;
 Board shorts;
 One-piece and two-piece women's swimsuits;
 Micro-fleece with half-zipper;
 Windbreaker pants;
 Baseball caps, knit cap, and floppy hats
 Lightweight windbreaker jackets;
 Heavyweight jackets; and
 Rashguards

Badges and patches 
Most lifeguards are wearing a departmental badge that consists of a shield surmounted by a bear, and are silver-colored metal. The words "County of Los Angeles" appear on a ribbon at the top of the badge just under the bear, followed by ribbons with the words "Fire Department" appear just above the seal of the county. The title of the position of the person is inscribed on a ribbon placed just below the county's seal and the serial number of the badge appears at the bottom of the badge below the title of the position. The words "Ocean Lifeguard Specialist", "Ocean Lifeguard", "Captain" and "Chief" may also appear on the face of badges issued to employees or retired employees authorized by the Fire Department and board of supervisors to carry such badges.

Shoulder patches 
Los Angeles County lifeguards wear a patch on their left sleeve that reads "County of Los Angeles Fire Dept. Lifeguard". Lifeguards that are licensed as paramedics wear a similar patch that identifies them as such.

Lifeguard vehicles 
All Toyota Tacoma trucks are currently assigned a sectional beach in Los Angeles County since deploying its new vehicle since 2015.

References

External links 

 
 Los Angeles County Fire Department
 Watch the Water – a public safety program

Government of Los Angeles County, California
Lifesaving organizations
Lifesaving in the United States
1914 establishments in California